Urarinas District is one of five districts of the province Loreto in Peru. In addition to Jivaroan-speaking peoples, a major indigenous Amazonian group residing in this District is the Urarina people.

References

Districts of the Loreto Province
Districts of the Loreto Region